Khirbet Yajouz (or Khirbet Mudraj) is an archaeological site 11 km northeast of Amman, Jordan.

An ancient Roman city was built on the site around the 4th century ACE.  It was superseded by a Byzantine city that lasted until the end of the 7th century ACE.

Expeditions
Khirbet Yajouz was first mentioned in 1876 by the explorer Miral.  He described some of the architectural elements such as columns, crowns, thresholds and stone supports that carried some plant motifs and human forms.  He pointed to the water system at the site, and mentioned some architectural monuments that indicate the presence of two churches.

The researcher Conder described the site in  1881.  The traveler Macon also visited the site in 1930. . He mentioned the presence of a large gathering to collect water, and indicates the large number of graves and graves with vertical entrances. He also spoke about the presence of a church, and pointed out the importance of the Yajouz site, which is on the road linking  Petra, Philadelphia, Jericho and Decapolis.In 1937 , the researcher Glock noted that Khirbet Yajouz, was on the Roman road linking Amman to Jerash.

Excavations 
In 1972 , Henry performed the first archaeological excavations at the site, as he uncovered a group of Roman graves in the southwestern region of Khirbet, in addition to cleaning some of the rock caves that were used as burials in the Roman period and some of them were reused as olive presses in the Byzantine period.

The General Department of Antiquities of the Government of Jordan performed an accidental rescue excavation of the site in 1994, when a basilica church was discovered, whose floor was paved with mosaics.

The Department of Archeology at the University of Jordan supervised excavation and excavation work at the site in 1995, and work is still ongoing to train students of the department in excavation and excavation work in the archaeological site, and methods for the detection, maintenance, restoration and documentation of monuments in an accurate scientific manner.
During the excavations, a small church was found extending from east to west.

References

External Links
Photos of Yajuz at the American Center of Research

Archaeological sites in Jordan
Ancient Greek archaeological sites in Western Asia
New Testament cities